The Secretariat of the 14th Congress of the All-Union Communist Party (Bolsheviks) was in session from 1925 to 1927.

Composition

Members

Candidate

References

Secretariat of the Central Committee of the Communist Party of the Soviet Union members
1925 establishments in the Soviet Union
1927 disestablishments in the Soviet Union